Madan Bauri is an Indian politician belonging to All India Trinamool Congress. He was elected as a member of West Bengal Legislative Assembly from Malatipur in 2001 and 2006. He joined All India Trinamool Congress from Communist Party of India (Marxist) on 4 April 2018.

References

Living people
Trinamool Congress politicians from West Bengal
West Bengal MLAs 2001–2006
West Bengal MLAs 2006–2011
Place of birth missing (living people)
Year of birth missing (living people)